The 2019 Japanese Super Formula Championship was the forty-seventh season of premier Japanese open-wheel motor racing, and the seventh under the moniker of Super Formula. The season began on 21 April at Suzuka Circuit and ended on 27 October at the same location.

2019 marked the first season of the Dallara SF19 chassis package, while continuing the engine configuration of the preceding chassis.

Nick Cassidy clinched his first Driver's Championship title, after finishing ahead of reigning champion Naoki Yamamoto at the season finale at Suzuka. Docomo Team Dandelion Racing won their first Teams' Championship title since 2012, with Naoki Yamamoto and Nirei Fukuzumi driving for them.

Teams and drivers

Team changes
German team Motopark will enter the championship in collaboration with the B-MAX Racing Team.

Driver changes

Honda
Lucas Auer announce to joining Super Formula with B-MAX Motopark after Mercedes AMG shut down their DTM project. Former FIA European Formula Three Championship driver Harrison Newey was later confirmed in a second B-MAX car.
2018 champion Naoki Yamamoto moves to Team Dandelion Racing after eight seasons driving for Team Mugen. He is joined by Nirei Fukuzumi, who completed a partial season with Mugen in 2018 alongside FIA Formula 2. Nobuharu Matsushita leaves Team Dandelion after a single season, returning to Formula 2 with Carlin.
Tomoki Nojiri moves from Team Dandelion to Team Mugen. He will be partnered by 2018 FIA Formula 3 European Championship runner-up and two-time Macau Grand Prix winner Daniel Ticktum, who competed in two rounds for the team in 2018.
Koudai Tsukakoshi leaves Real Racing's Super Formula team after six seasons. He is replaced by Tristan Charpentier, who raced in the BRDC British Formula 3 Championship in 2018. Prior to the second round of the championship, it was announced that Tsukakoshi would be returning to the seat for the remainder of the season.
Narain Karthikeyan and Takuya Izawa are replaced at Nakajima Racing by Formula 2 race winner Tadasuke Makino and former European and Japanese Formula Three driver Álex Palou. Karthikeyan will remain with the team in Super GT.

Toyota
2018 series runner-up Nick Cassidy will move from Kondō Racing to Team Tom's, replacing James Rossiter.
2016 champion Yuji Kunimoto will take Cassidy's place at Kondo Racing, after Toyota promoted 2018 Japanese F3 champion Sho Tsuboi to his former seat at cerumo・INGING.
Artem Markelov, a five-season veteran of the GP2 Series and FIA Formula 2 with Russian Time, joins Super Formula in the #7 Team LeMans, which in 2018 was driven by both Pietro Fittipaldi and Tom Dillmann.

Mid-season changes 

 Tristan Charpentier left Real Racing after the first round. He had qualified two seconds off the pace in the first round and crashed heavily in the race. He was replaced by veteran racer Koudai Tsukakoshi for the rest of the season.
Dan Ticktum left Team Mugen after the third round. He was dropped by the Red Bull Junior programme and subsequently lost his Super Formula drive. He was replaced by new Red Bull Junior, Patricio O'Ward for the remainder of the season. However, O'Ward was dropped prior to the final round from the Red Bull Junior Team and thus for the final round, the seat was filled by Estonian Jüri Vips.
Yuichi Nakayama replaced Artem Markelov at the sixth round due to Markelov being called up to race for BWT Arden in the FIA Formula 2 Championship

Race calendar and results
The calendar with seven rounds was announced in August 2018.

Championship standings

Drivers' Championship
Scoring system

Driver standings

Teams' Championship

References

External links
Japanese Championship Super Formula official website 

2019
Super Formula
Super Formula